was a Japanese rower. He competed in the men's eight event at the 1964 Summer Olympics.

References

1941 births
2003 deaths
Japanese male rowers
Olympic rowers of Japan
Rowers at the 1964 Summer Olympics
Place of birth missing